The JRA Award for Best Three-Year-Old Filly is a title awarded annually by the Japan Racing Association (JRA).
Since 1987 the honor has been part of the JRA Awards.

Winners

References

Horse racing in Japan: JRA Awards

Horse racing awards
Horse racing in Japan